Chris Collins (born August 20, 1982) is a former American football player who played one season for the Pittsburgh Steelers of the National Football League. he played college football at the University of Mississippi for the Ole Miss Rebels football team.

References

1982 births
Living people
American football wide receivers
Pittsburgh Steelers players
Ole Miss Rebels football players